Shashibhai Mavajibhai Jamod (Gujarati: શાશિભાઈ માવજીભાઈ જામોડ) (20 November 1938 – 19 September 1990) was an Indian politician, social worker, lawyer, engineer and businessmen. He was elected to the Lok Sabha, the lower house of the Parliament of India from Bhavnagar in Gujarat as a member of the Indian National Congress.

Early life 
Shashibhai Jamod was born to a Koli Mavajibhai Jamod on 20 November 1938 in Gujarat. Jamod was married to Hiraben on 6 February 1966.

Positions held by Jamod 
 March 1985 to May 1985, State minister for Gujarat government
 1985–89, Member of legislative assembly Gujarat
 1987–88, Backward Classes Committee

International travels 
Shashibhai Jamod traveled to United Kingdom, United States and Canada.

References

External links
Official biographical sketch in Parliament of India website

Koli people
India MPs 1989–1991
Lok Sabha members from Gujarat
1938 births
1990 deaths